Olympia 74 is an album of songs by Dalida recorded live at the Olympia in Paris and released in 1974.

Track listing
 "Entrez sans frapper"
 "Pour ne pas vivre seul"
 "Nous sommes tous morts à 20 ans"
 "Que sont devenues les fleurs ?"
 "Ô Seigneur Dieu"
 "Il venait d'avoir 18 ans"
 "Avec le temps"
 "Je suis malade"
 "Gigi l'amoroso"

See also
 List of Dalida songs
 Dalida albums discography
 Dalida singles discography

References
 Dalida Official Website

External links
 Dalida Official Website "Discography" section

Dalida albums
Albums recorded at the Olympia (Paris)
1974 live albums